Darimosuvito Tokijan (born 14 February 1963), more commonly known as D. Tokijan, is a Singaporean football midfielder who played for Singapore in the 1984 Asian Cup. He also played for Jurong Town and Singapore FA.

After retiring, Tokijan has been a football coach, and was the Geylang United Prime League team head coach in 2007, having spent the previous five years as coach of SAFSA. He was the assistant coach for Tanjong Pagar United F.C. until the end of 2013 season. In 2014, Tokijan was appointed as assistant coach to Marko Kraljević in Balestier Khalsa, and was also responsible as the head coach of their Prime League squad.

References

External links
Stats
International stats at 11v11.com

1963 births
Living people
Singaporean footballers
Singapore international footballers
Singapore FA players
1984 AFC Asian Cup players
Jurong FC players
Association football midfielders
Footballers at the 1990 Asian Games
Southeast Asian Games silver medalists for Singapore
Southeast Asian Games bronze medalists for Singapore
Southeast Asian Games medalists in football
Competitors at the 1985 Southeast Asian Games
Asian Games competitors for Singapore